Bruno Mario Rossetti (9 October 1960 – 9 February 2018) was an Italian sport shooter and Olympic medalist. He received a bronze medal in skeet shooting at the 1992 Summer Olympics in Barcelona. Rossetti was born in Troyes, Aube, France.

His son is Gabriele Rossetti, a gold medalist in shooting at the 2016 Summer Olympics.

References

1960 births
2018 deaths
Sportspeople from Troyes
Italian male sport shooters
Olympic shooters of Italy
Olympic bronze medalists for Italy
Shooters at the 1992 Summer Olympics
Olympic medalists in shooting
Medalists at the 1992 Summer Olympics
20th-century Italian people